Montceau-les-Mines is a commune in the Saône-et-Loire department in the region of Bourgogne-Franche-Comté in eastern France.

It is the second-largest commune of the metropolitan Communauté urbaine Creusot Montceau, which lies southwest of the city of Dijon.

History
Montceau-les-Mines is a former mining city. Coal was discovered in the area in the 16th Century. A hamlet called "Le Montceau" developed from this discovery.

"Le Montceau" began to grow after the building of the Canal du Centre, built between 1783 and 1791. A business entity, "Compagnie des mines", started to extract coals in 1833.

The commune was officially established June 24, 1856. as Montceau-les-Mines, a community of 1300 inhabitants, drawn from a territory formed from the villages of Blanzy, Saint-Vallier, Saint-Berain-sous-Sanvignes, and Sanvignes-les-Mines.

A graveyard and a church were built by the principal coal company, a sign of paternalism of mining industry.

Intense social movements took place at the end of the 19th century and there at the beginning of the 20th century.

Coal made the city prosperous until 1918. During the War, the production reached 2,786,000 tons. There were about 30,000 inhabitants.
After the war, the production started to decrease and stopped in 1992.  Economic hardship followed the closing of the mines.  By 2017 the population has fallen to about 18,000, unemployment is 21% and many shops of the city have closed.

Population

Geography/geology
The Bourbince flows northward through the commune and crosses the town.
Exceptional preservation of Late Carboniferous fossil biota characterizes a Lagerstätte at Montceau-les-Mines.

See also
Communes of the Saône-et-Loire department

International relations

Montceau-les-Mines is twinned with:
 Żory in Poland

References

External links

 Official website

Communes of Saône-et-Loire